King High School may refer to:

King College Prep High School in Chicago, Illinois
King High School (Corpus Christi, Texas), Corpus Christi, Texas
King High School (Kingsville, Texas), Kingsville, Texas
King City High School (California), King City, California
King City High School (Missouri), King City, Missouri
C. Leon King High School, Tampa, Florida
Grace King High School, Metairie, Louisiana
King Philip Regional High School, Wrentham, Massachusetts
Admiral King High School, Lorain, Ohio
C. E. King High School, Harris County, Texas
King George High School, King George, Virginia
King William High School, King William, Virginia
Rufus King High School, Milwaukee, Wisconsin

See also 
Martin Luther King High School (disambiguation)